Deerwalk is an unincorporated community in Wood County, West Virginia, United States.

The community was named for a deer trail near the original town site.

References

Unincorporated communities in Wood County, West Virginia
Unincorporated communities in West Virginia